Custer County is a county in the U.S. state of South Dakota. As of the 2020 United States Census, the population was 8,318. Its county seat is Custer. The county was created in 1875, and was organized in 1877.

Geography
Custer County lies on the west line of South Dakota. Its west boundary line abuts the east boundary line of the state of Wyoming. The Cheyenne River flows northeastward along the upper portion of the county's east boundary. Battle Creek flows southeastward in the upper eastern part of the county, discharging into Cheyenne River along the county's northeastern boundary line. Spring Creek flows northeastward through the upper eastern part of the county, discharging into the river just north of the county border. The county terrain is mountainous, especially its western portion. The terrain slopes to the east; its lowest point is its NE corner at 2,461' (750m) above sea level (ASL). Its highest point is a mountain crest along the north boundary line, at 6,657' (2029m) ASL.

Major highways

 U.S. Highway 16
 U.S. Highway 385
 U.S. Highway 16A
 South Dakota Highway 36
 South Dakota Highway 40
 South Dakota Highway 79
 South Dakota Highway 87
 South Dakota Highway 89

Adjacent counties

 Pennington County - north
 Oglala Lakota County - southeast
 Fall River County - south
 Niobrara County, Wyoming - southwest
 Weston County, Wyoming - west

Protected areas

 Black Hills National Forest (part)
 Black Elk Wilderness (part)
 Buffalo Gap National Grassland (part)
 Custer State Park
 Jewel Cave National Monument
 Wind Cave National Park

Demographics

2000 census
As of the 2000 United States Census, there were 7,275 people, 2,970 households, and 2,067 families in the county. The population density was 5 people per square mile (2/km2). There were 3,624 housing units at an average density of 2 per square mile (1/km2). The racial makeup of the county was 94.17% White, 0.27% Black or African American, 3.12% Native American, 0.18% Asian, 0.01% Pacific Islander, 0.36% from other races, and 1.88% from two or more races.  1.51% of the population were Hispanic or Latino of any race. 32.2% were of German, 9.8% Irish, 9.2% English, 7.1% Norwegian and 5.7% American ancestry.

There were 2,970 households, out of which 26.90% had children under the age of 18 living with them, 60.20% were married couples living together, 6.60% had a female householder with no husband present, and 30.40% were non-families. 25.90% of all households were made up of individuals, and 10.30% had someone living alone who was 65 years of age or older. The average household size was 2.35 and the average family size was 2.80.

The county population contained 24.10% under the age of 18, 6.30% from 18 to 24, 22.40% from 25 to 44, 31.10% from 45 to 64, and 16.00% who were 65 years of age or older. The median age was 43 years. For every 100 females there were 104.40 males. For every 100 females age 18 and over, there were 99.40 males.

The median income for a household in the county was $36,303, and the median income for a family was $43,628. Males had a median income of $30,475 versus $20,781 for females. The per capita income for the county was $17,945. About 6.20% of families and 9.40% of the population were below the poverty line, including 13.00% of those under age 18 and 7.40% of those age 65 or over.

2010 census
As of the 2010 United States Census, there were 8,216 people, 3,636 households, and 2,427 families in the county. The racial makeup of the county was 94.2% white, 2.9% American Indian, 0.4% Asian, 0.2% black or African American, 0.4% from other races, and 2.0% from two or more races. Those of Hispanic or Latino origin made up 2.2% of the population. In terms of ancestry, 42.1% were German, 13.1% were Irish, 11.4% were English, 10.8% were Norwegian, and 7.9% were American.

Of the 3,636 households, 21.7% had children under the age of 18 living with them, 58.2% were married couples living together, 5.5% had a female householder with no husband present, 33.3% were non-families, and 28.4% of all households were made up of individuals. The average household size was 2.19 and the average family size was 2.65. The median age was 50.3 years.

The median income for a household in the county was $46,743 and the median income for a family was $58,253. Males had a median income of $39,194 versus $29,375 for females. The per capita income for the county was $24,353. About 4.3% of families and 9.7% of the population were below the poverty line, including 10.9% of those under age 18 and 11.7% of those age 65 or over.

Communities

City
 Custer (county seat)

Towns
 Buffalo Gap (Population: 131)
 Fairburn (Population: 60)
 Hermosa (Population: 382)
 Pringle (Population: 109)

Unincorporated communities
 Dewey
 Four Mile

Townships
The county is divided into two areas of territory:
 East of Custer State Park
 West of Custer State Park

Politics
Custer County voters are strongly Republican. In only one national election since 1936 has the county selected the Democratic Party candidate.

See also

 National Register of Historic Places listings in Custer County, South Dakota
 Crazy Horse Memorial

References

 
Black Hills
1877 establishments in Dakota Territory
Populated places established in 1877